A by-election for the seat of Bowral in the New South Wales Legislative Assembly was held on 14 June 1895 because William McCourt was forced to resign because he was bankrupt, but was re-elected unopposed.

Dates

Result

William McCourt resigned due to bankruptcy.

See also
Electoral results for the district of Bowral
List of New South Wales state by-elections

References

1895 elections in Australia
New South Wales state by-elections
1890s in New South Wales